The Glasgow and South Western Railway (GSWR) 99 class is a class of four 0-2-2-0 steam locomotives designed in 1855.

Development 
Four examples of class designed by Patrick Stirling were built for the GSWR by R and W Hawthorn between April and August  1855. Little is known about the class which is variously described as having a "dummy crank" or a "crank axle."

Withdrawal 
The  members of the class were  apparently not successful and all were withdrawn by James Stirling during 1866 and 1867.

References 

 
 

099
Standard gauge steam locomotives of Great Britain
Railway locomotives introduced in 1855
0-2-2-0 locomotives